Rappephyceae, or Rappemonads, are a small family of protists first described in 2011, of uncertain phylogenic affinity. It has been discussed as a possible member of a larger clade Haptophyta. This newly identified taxonomic class of phytoplankton are named after a professor from the Hawai’i institute of marine biology, known as Michael Rappé. Rappé discovered these phytoplankton in the Atlantic Ocean and published his findings on their DNA in 1998. Current research has shown that these organisms provide an immense amount of nutritional organic molecules, such as oxygen, for other organisms using biochemical processes like photosynthesis and carbon fixation.

Classification 
Rappephyceae belong to the Haptophyte clade. The haptophytes comprise around 500 marine algal species. One of the most novel characteristics of haptophytes is their calcite, or calcium carbonate, scales that cover the cell. These cells are also known as coccoliths and the whole organism can be referred to as a coccolithophore. Coccolithophores are responsible for approximately 50% of the calcium carbonate precipitation in oceans. While Rappephyceae are a newly classified group, they likely share many evolutionary properties with other Coccolithophores. Rappephyceae earn their own class from their unique morphology. They represent a plastid-bearing protistan lineage, identified using molecular sequencing techniques with environmental plastid 16s rRNA. Using DNA libraries it was discovered that these species are closely related to Gephyrocapsa huxleyi and Prymnesium parvum which are both primary producers.

Biological properties 
As members of the Haptophyte clade, Rappephyceae are considered autotrophs. Similar to plants, phytoplankton contain chlorophyl in their cells which act to capture sunlight, carbon dioxide, and water; These molecules are converted from light energy to chemical energy creating essential biomolecules like oxygen and glucose. Since phytoplankton have no use for the oxygen molecules, they are released and acquired by more complex organisms. This process is often referred to as Photosynthesis, or the light cycle as it occurs in the presence of sunlight. This characteristic give Rappephyceae the title of primary producers.

Since Rappephyceae are considered Cocclithophores, they can act as microfossils giving insight into previous ecological conditions.

References

Further reading 
 

Hacrobia